Hisakatsu Yabe (December 3, 1878 - June 23, 1969) was a Japanese paleontologist and geologist.  He is from Tokyo and is a graduate of the University of Tokyo. He was an emeritus professor at Tohoku University. Yabe contributed to the development of geology in Japan. In 1918, He advocated Itoigawa-Shizuoka Tectonic Line.

References

External links 

 
 

1878 births
1969 deaths
Japanese geologists
Japanese paleontologists
Recipients of the Order of Culture
Recipients of the Order of the Sacred Treasure, 1st class
Members of the Japan Academy
Academic staff of Tohoku University
University of Tokyo alumni
People from Tokyo